Scooby-Doo is a series of animated television programs.

Scooby-Doo may also refer to:

 Scooby-Doo (character), the titular Great Dane of the series
 Scooby-Doo (film), a 2002 live-action film based on the Scooby-Doo series
 Scooby-Doo (soundtrack), a soundtrack album from the film
 Scooby-Doo Spooky Coaster, a roller coaster
 Scooby's Ghoster Coaster, a roller coaster
 Scooby-Doo (video game), video game based on the Scooby-Doo series
 Scooby, a colloquial name for the Subaru Impreza

See also
List of Scooby-Doo media
Scooby (disambiguation)
Scoubidou (disambiguation)